Powell Channel is a narrow channel between Millerand Island and Debenham Islands, off the west coast of Graham Land. Named by United Kingdom Antarctic Place-Names Committee (UK-APC) for Lieutenant John M. Powell, Royal Navy, who surveyed the channel in 1972.

Straits of Graham Land
Fallières Coast